Elvis' Christmas Album (also reissued as It's Christmas Time) is the third studio album and first Christmas album by  American singer and musician Elvis Presley on RCA Victor, LOC -1035, a deluxe limited edition, released October 15, 1957, and recorded at Radio Recorders in Hollywood. It has been reissued in numerous different formats since its first release. It spent four weeks at No. 1 on the Billboard Top Pop Albums chart, and was the first of two Christmas-themed albums Presley would record, the other being Elvis Sings the Wonderful World of Christmas, released in 1971. The publication Music Vendor listed Elvis' Christmas Album on their singles charts for two weeks in December 1957 – January 1958, with a peak position of No. 49.

According to the Recording Industry Association of America (RIAA), Elvis' Christmas Album along with its reissues has shipped at least 17 million copies in the United States. It is the first Presley title to attain Diamond certification by the RIAA, and is also the best-selling Christmas album of all time in the United States. With total sales of more 20 million copies worldwide, it remains the world's best-selling Christmas album and one of the best-selling albums of all time.

Content
The original 1957 LP consisted of six popular Christmas songs, two traditional Christmas carols and four gospel songs which had been previously released on the EP Peace in the Valley, catalogue EPA 4054, issued March 1957, peaking at No. 3 on the Pop albums chart and at No. 39 on the singles chart. The two album sides are divided into a program of secular Christmas songs on side one, with two traditional Christmas carols and the gospel numbers on side two. These included two spirituals by innovator Thomas A. Dorsey, "Peace in the Valley" and "Take My Hand, Precious Lord". Coincidentally, A Jolly Christmas from Frank Sinatra, released the previous month, was also divided into secular and traditional sides.

While most of the songs selected were traditional Christmas fare, such as "White Christmas" and "Silent Night", two new songs by regular suppliers of material for Presley were commissioned. One was "Santa Bring My Baby Back (to Me)" and the other (selected by Presley to open the album), was a blues-based rock and roll number, "Santa Claus Is Back in Town", written by Jerry Leiber and Mike Stoller. This writer/producer team was responsible for some of 1950s rhythm and blues and rock and roll's most finely-honed satire in their work with the Coasters, as well as penning "Hound Dog" for Willie Mae Thornton and providing Presley with some of his biggest hits, including "Jailhouse Rock" and "Don't".

Presley asked the pair to come up with another Christmas song during sessions for the album; within a few minutes, they had the song written and ready for recording. Originally titled "Christmas Blues", this slyly risqué number is given a full-throated treatment by Presley who, aided by the gritty ensemble playing from his band, was determined to ensure that this Christmas album would not be easily ignored. Much of the remaining program was performed in a more traditional manner appropriate to the solemnity of Christmas, although Presley's innate sense of occasion shone through on his left-of-center reading of Ernest Tubb's 1949 hit, "Blue Christmas".

"Silent Night" and "O Little Town of Bethlehem" were arranged by Presley himself.

The Bing Crosby holiday perennial "White Christmas", which appeared every year on the Billboard charts from 1942 to 1962, became the center of controversy upon the album's release, with calls by the song's composer Irving Berlin to have the song, and the entire album, banned from radio airplay. After hearing Presley's version of his song, which Berlin saw as a "profane parody of his cherished yuletide standard", he ordered his staff in New York to telephone radio stations across the United States, demanding the song be discontinued from radio play. While most US radio stations ignored Berlin's request, at least one disc jockey was fired for playing a song from the album, and most Canadian stations refused to play the album.

The controversy was, ironically, fueled by Presley's performance of the song in a style mirroring the version by Clyde McPhatter's group, The Drifters, which had been a Top 10 hit on the R&B singles chart in 1954 and 1955. Unlike Presley's recording, however, their version attracted virtually no adverse reaction, and certainly no reported opposition from Berlin. Part of the reason that The Drifters' version of "White Christmas" was less controversial was that this version was played only on black radio stations. Presley's version brought greater attention to The Drifters' version which gained prominence with its inclusion in the 1990 movie Home Alone.

Packaging
Original 1957 copies of Elvis' Christmas Album (LOC-1035) were issued with a red booklet-like album cover (as shown above) featuring promotional photos from Presley's third movie Jailhouse Rock. Even rarer than the cover and record itself is a gold foil price tag-shaped "gift giving" sticker attached to the shrink wrap, reading "TO __, FROM _, ELVIS SINGS", followed by a list of the tracks. Original copies with the gold sticker intact on the shrink wrap have proven to be among the most valuable of Presley's albums. Adding to its already high value are limited red vinyl albums and album covers with gold print down the spine.

Record labels for all original 1957 pressings are black with all-silver print, the famous RCA Victor "His Master's Voice" dog logo at the top of the label, and "LONG 33 PLAY" at the bottom.

45 RPM releases
The other new composition on the album, "Santa, Bring My Baby Back to Me" was paired with "Santa Claus Is Back in Town", and issued as the UK single concurrently with the album's release. The single reached number seven on the UK Singles Chart in November 1957.

No singles were issued in the US until 1964, when "Blue Christmas" was paired with "Wooden Heart", and reached No. 1 on the Billboard Christmas Singles chart; however, a pairing of "Blue Christmas" b/w "White Christmas" became a Top 20 UK hit in late 1964. "Santa Claus Is Back In Town"/"Blue Christmas" was a 1965 single release for the US market, and reached No. 4 on the Billboard Christmas Singles chart. "Blue Christmas" would re-enter the Christmas or Holiday Singles chart several times in the years that follow.

Two different EPs, Elvis Sings Christmas Songs, EPA 4108 in December 1957, and Christmas with Elvis, EPA 4340 in December 1958, divided the eight Christmas numbers between them. The former topped the newly established Billboard EP Chart, while the latter failed to chart.

Reissues

First reissue on RCA Victor

Elvis' Christmas Album was reissued two years after its first release in October 1959 while Presley was on duty in Germany. The deluxe fold-out cover was replaced with a regular cover with a close-up of Elvis as he posed against an outdoor, snowy backdrop. The album continued to reach the album charts each year until 1962, eventually selling more than three million copies in the U.S.

Second reissue on RCA Camden

In 1971, Elvis recorded a new Christmas album, Elvis Sings the Wonderful World of Christmas; The original Elvis' Christmas Album went out of print, but continued interest in the album prompted RCA to reissue a revised and truncated version on its budget label RCA Camden in November 1970. This reissue replaced the four gospel tracks from the Peace in the Valley EP with the 1966 holiday single "If Every Day Was Like Christmas", along with the 1970 non-seasonal B-side "Mama Liked the Roses", issued as the flip to Elvis's top ten single "The Wonder of You" and originating from Presley's acclaimed 1969 Memphis sessions; neither track had been available on LP format previously. With ten tracks and a shorter running time, it fit the standard for RCA's budget Camden label issues at the time. The religious and secular Christmas songs were also mixed. The initial cover of this revised version echoed that of the 1958 reissue, except a more recent photograph with Elvis wearing a blue racing jacket with two white stripes on the left was used from the set of the 1967 movie Speedway. The album was also released in the UK with an album cover that featured Elvis's face from the 1970 Camden release in a circle in the middle surrounded in white with the title and the song selections in red. The four Peace in the Valley tracks were reissued the next year on the RCA Camden compilation You'll Never Walk Alone.

Third reissue on Pickwick
During the mid-1970s, RCA leased the rights to some of its Camden recordings to the budget reissue label Pickwick Records. Pickwick reissued the 10-track Camden Christmas album in 1975 with yet another cover design, Elvis's photo from the RCA Camden version surrounded by red ribbons with holly underneath and a dark blue background. Before and during the holiday season after Presley's death in August 1977, the Pickwick LP was advertised and sold on television via mail order to enormous sales, later certified by the RIAA as selling in excess of ten million copies. Demand for Presley's recordings increased greatly after his death, and RCA promptly reclaimed the reissue rights to its Camden line from Pickwick. The Christmas Album was reissued in the 1980s on LP and compact disc as an RCA Special Products release on the RCA Camden label and on CD in Canada in the RCA Camden Classics series. This reissue, with its Pickwick cover art but carrying RCA logos, was in print throughout the 1990s; the track listing remained unchanged from the original 1970 RCA Camden release.

Other reissues
In 1976, the album was reissued on cassette with the title Blue Christmas; this reissue also had an alternate track listing. In 1985, the album was reissued again but with a new title, It's Christmas Time; shortly after, RCA reissued the original 1957 version of the album with a recreation of its original cover art on CD, and gatefold sleeve on LP. In 1995, RCA/BMG Special Products again reissued the Camden/Pickwick compilation retitled Elvis Christmas with new cover art. By the second decade of the 21st Century, It's Christmas Time had become the second biggest selling album in the series, earning a 4× Platinum certification on March 8, 2018, prompting the original 1957 version to be available once again in the 2016 60 CD boxed set containing all of Presley's original RCA albums, Elvis Presley – The RCA Album Collection.

In the January 5, 2019 issue of Billboard, It's Christmas Time appeared for the first time inside the top 40 albums of the Billboard 200 charts, placing at number 25.

All of the above tracks are also available on several other RCA compilations of Presley's Christmas recordings, including Christmas Peace from 2003 and Elvis Christmas (a different, expanded version of the 1995 issue) from 2006. All of the tracks are also available on the 1992 RCA boxed set The King of Rock 'n' Roll: The Complete 50's Masters. In late 2007, Speaker's Corner Records from Germany reissued the album on a high-quality heavy vinyl pressing; this reissue also featured a reproduction of the original album cover and RCA Victor label from 1957. In addition, in 2010, a DVD was released in a series from Sony Music called The Yule Log DVD, in which the music from Elvis' Christmas Album (but without "I'll Be Home for Christmas") is featured with three different holiday visuals (one of them the yule log of the series' title). The original LP cover is featured on the DVD menu.

Track listing

Camden / Pickwick edition

Notes
 signifies arranged by

Personnel
The Blue Moon Boys
 Elvis Presley – lead vocals, acoustic rhythm guitar 
 Scotty Moore – electric lead guitar 
 Bill Black – bass 
 D. J. Fontana – drums 
The Jordanaires
 Neal Matthews - backing vocals 
 Hugh Jarrett - backing vocals
 Gordon Stoker – backing vocals, piano (tracks B3-B5)
 Hoyt Hawkins – backing vocals, organ (track B6)
Additional Personnel
 Dudley Brooks – piano (tracks A1-B2, B6) 
 Millie Kirkham - backing vocals (tracks A1-B2)

Charts

Weekly charts

Year-end charts

Certifications

See also
List of best-selling albums
List of Billboard number-one albums of 1957
List of Billboard 200 number-one albums of 1958

Notes

References
 Guralnick, Peter. The King of Rock 'n' Roll: The Complete 50's Masters, insert booklet. RCA 66050-2, 1992.
 Guralnick, Peter. From Nashville to Memphis: The Essential '60s Masters, insert booklet. RCA 66160-2, 1993.
 
 
 
 Wolfe, Charles. Elvis Presley: If Every Day Was Like Christmas, liner notes. BMG Australia Limited, 7863664822, 1994.
 White Christmas by Irving Berlin

External links

 LOC-1035 Elvis' Christmas Album Guide part of The Elvis Presley Record Research Database

Elvis Presley albums
1957 Christmas albums
Albums produced by Steve Sholes
Christmas albums by American artists
Covers albums
Pickwick Records albums
Rock Christmas albums
RCA Records Christmas albums
RCA Victor albums
Albums recorded at Radio Recorders